A victory lap is a term used in motorsports or any sport championship to describe an extra lap of the race track after the conclusion of a race or after a team have been crowned as the champion.

Victory lap may also refer to:
 Victory lap (academia)
 Victory Lap (Propagandhi album), 2017, or the title track
 Victory Lap (Nipsey Hussle album), 2018, or the title track
 "Victory Lap", a song by All That Remains from the 2015 album The Order of Things
 Victory Laps'', a 2011 EP by DOOMSTARKS, or the title track